Young and Beautiful may refer to:

 "Young and Beautiful" (Elvis Presley song)
 "Young and Beautiful" (Lana Del Rey song)
 Young and Beautiful (film), a 1934 American film directed by Joseph Santley
 Young & Beautiful, a 2013 French film directed François Ozon
 The Young and Beautiful, a 1955 Broadway play based on the stories of F. Scott Fitzgerald